The P9RC is a semi-automatic pistol designed by József Kameniczky and manufactured by the FÉGARMY Arms Factory of Hungary. It was selected as the new service pistol of the Hungarian military and police, replacing the PA-63 after 1996.

History
After the collapse of the Soviet Union in 1990, the Hungarian military sought to replace its FÉG PA-63 sidearms in the Soviet 9×18mm Makarov cartridge with a handgun in the more powerful 9×19mm Parabellum. Originally the Israeli Baby Eagle/Jericho 941 was used until a domestically produced weapon could be chosen. In 1996 the P9RC was selected as the new standard issue sidearm for both the Hungarian military and police forces.

Design and features
The P9RC is the slightly modified version of the P9R, a design based on the Browning Hi-Power and Smith & Wesson Model 59. There are 4 notable differences: the guide rod assembly, the bottom part of the barrel (on which the tilting barrel locking system works), the wider extractor and the grips. Earlier P9Rs had wooden grips, later ones came with plastics as well, while P9RCs were made with plastics only.

External links 
 FÉG Model P9RC Pistol, Army 96.M

Semi-automatic pistols of Hungary
Fegyver- és Gépgyár firearms
9mm Parabellum semi-automatic pistols